Igor Igorevich Spasovkhodskiy (born 1 August 1979 in Moscow) is a Russian triple jumper. He is best known for his bronze medal at the 2001 World Championships, which he took with a personal best jump of 17.44 metres.

International competitions

References

 

1979 births
Living people
Russian male triple jumpers
Olympic male triple jumpers
Olympic athletes of Russia
Athletes (track and field) at the 2000 Summer Olympics
Athletes (track and field) at the 2008 Summer Olympics
Competitors at the 2001 Summer Universiade
Competitors at the 2001 Goodwill Games
World Athletics Championships medalists
European Athletics Indoor Championships winners
Russian Athletics Championships winners